The Fortitude Valley Diehards, often referred to simply as Valleys, are an Australian semi-professional rugby league football club based in the Brisbane suburb of Fortitude Valley.

History
Until their demise in 1995, the Fortitude Valley Diehards, were the oldest surviving rugby league team in Brisbane, Australia, being formed in, and winning their first premiership, in 1909 – also the year of the inaugural Brisbane Rugby League premiership. They have roots tracing to 1908 and the first rugby league game in the state, between North Brisbane and Toombul, who would combine with Valleys in 1911.

They were by far and away Brisbane’s most successful rugby league team and one of the greatest clubs in Australian history, having won a total of 24 premierships in their 86 seasons, including seven of the first eleven premierships. With the introduction of the Brisbane Broncos into the Sydney Rugby League in 1988, Valleys formed a short-lived joint venture with the Tweed Heads Seagulls playing under the name Seagulls-Diehards, winning the 1988 premiership. The joint venture broke soon after and Valleys returned to their old name in 1989.

Financial difficulties in the early 1990s took their toll on the club, leading Valleys to a short-lived merger with the Caboolture Snakes, calling themselves Caboolture Valleys, in 1995. However the club folded at season’s end, preventing the foundation club from playing in the inaugural Queensland Cup in 1996.

In 2002, Valleys entered a partnership with another former Brisbane Rugby League team, Brothers, playing under the name Brothers-Valleys. Playing out of Perry Park, in the Brisbane suburb of Bowen Hills, approximately halfway between Fortitude Valley and Albion, the Two-Blues participated in the Mixwell Cup and Mixwell Colts Challenge, before being accepted into the Queensland Cup for Season 2004. Based at O'Callagahn Park in Zillmere, the club’s only premiership points that season were from a first round draw. At season’s end, Brothers Valleys announced a name change to Brothers Diehards, but were not accepted into the 2005 Queensland Cup, on the basis of club finance.

The Diehards still however compete in the Amateur Brisbane Second Division along with other Brisbane Clubs.

The club was readmitted to the Brisbane Rugby League in 2015.

Perhaps the greatest ever year for Valleys was their 1955 success during which the side remained undefeated under the peerless leadership of fullback Norm Pope.

As of 2021 Valleys compete in the QRL Women's Premiership, which is the strongest state-based competition in QLD. Their side features a number of representative players including Shenae Ciesiolka, Meg Ward, Ali Brigginshaw, Brianna Clark, Kody House and Lavinia Gould. They are coached by former international and Queensland representative NRL star Scott Prince.

Crest
Unlike many other rugby league teams in Australia, until it was forced upon them Valleys never had an official moniker. Although they were nicknamed the "Diehards", which came about from their reported "Diehard spirit" in tough games, until the Queensland Rugby League's rebranding process in the 1980s, which saw all BRL clubs adopt a logo framed by a stylised Q, Valleys identified themselves with a simple VFC (Valleys Football Club) monogram. With the introduction of the new logo in the 1980s, the monogram was relocated to the shield of the newly adopted Gladiator moniker, although for the next few seasons, the monogram remained on the jersey beneath the AVCO sponsorship logo.

Colours

Valleys had a very traditional playing strip, and were the simplest of the Brisbane Rugby League clubs. Their colours were royal blue, with a white collar, and a white butcher stripe (irregular hoop) vertically on each side of the shorts. Their socks were blue, although again were complemented by a white butcher stripe in the middle on occasion. The VFC monogram was white, as was the majority of sponsorship logos placed on the jersey.

Home ground

Although not technically in the Fortitude Valley area, the Diehards played out of what was then known as Neumann Oval in Albion, in the same area as the Albion Park trots and Brothers Rugby Union's Crosby Park. Following the Diehards departure for Caboolture, and eventual extinction, in 1995, Queensland Cricket purchased the ground and renamed it Allan Border Field. Currently Valleys Juniors, who evolved from the BRL team in 1951, play full-time at Emerson Park, Grange, and have done so since gradually moving out of Neumann Oval in the early 1970s.

Junior Clubs

Valleys Juniors, Valleys Hawthorne and Valleys United Stars (now Easts Bulimba Stars) were the only junior clubs that belonged to Valleys.

Representative Players

Australia
 Vic Armbruster
 Barry Brennan
 Edward Buckley
 Chris Close
 Arthur Edwards
 Vince Fawcett
 Declan Bradbury
 Duncan Hall
Mark Hohn
 Jack Horrigan
 Wally Lewis 
 Jack Little
 Ken McCaffery
 Mark Murray 
Bryan Niebling
 Fred Neumann
 Norm Pope
 Ross Strudwick
 Roy Westaway
 Ali Brigginshaw

Great Britain
 Tulsen Tollett

Queensland (State of Origin)
Gavin Allen
Chris Close
 Ross Henrick
Mark Hohn
 Wally Lewis
Norm McGregor
 Mark Murray
 Bryan Niebling
 Grant Rix
 Shenae Ciesiolka

Queensland (Residents)
 Mark Shipway
David Bourke
Shane Buckley
Nicholas Butler
Ty Carlyon
Peter Coyne
Brett Daunt
Kelly Egan
Bill Holmes
Eric Kennedy
Gerard Kerr
Steele Retchless
Frank Rolls
Shaun Rubesaame
Trevor Schodel
Craig Marshall
Greg Walker

Pre State of Origin/Bulimba Cup
Albert Park

Sponsors 
 Bank of Qld Stafford
 Adenbrook Homes
 Scotch & Soda
 Elevate Training
 LOCO Earthmoving

Sources

 Lester, Gary. The Sun Book of Rugby League
 Lester, Gary. Action '85

See also

References

External links

Frederick William Neumann (aka Firpo) Papers 1926-1970s. State Library of Queensland

Rugby clubs established in 1908
1908 establishments in Australia
Rugby league teams in Brisbane
Fortitude Valley, Queensland